A list of the films produced in Mexico in 1951 (see 1951 in film):

1951

See also
1951 in Mexico

External links

1951
Films
Lists of 1951 films by country or language